Joseph Wouters, also known as Jos, (born 21 February 1942 in Keerbergen) is a Belgian former road cyclist. Professional from 1961 to 1965, he won the classics Paris–Tours, Paris–Brussels and the Brabantse Pijl.

Major results

1961
 1st Paris–Tours
 1st Ronde van Brabant
1962
 1st Paris–Brussels
 1st Ronde van Brabant
 1st Stage 7 Vuelta a Levante
 2nd Ronde van Limburg
 4th Liège–Bastogne–Liège
 6th Paris–Roubaix
 10th Tour of Flanders
1963
 1st Ronde van Limburg
 1st Brabantse Pijl
 1st Stages 2 & 4 Tour of Belgium
 1st Stage 3 Paris–Nice
 4th Paris–Brussels
 5th Tour of Flanders
 9th Gent–Wevelgem
1964
 8th Gent–Wevelgem

References

External links
 

1942 births
Living people
Belgian male cyclists
20th-century Belgian people